Nijmeegse Mixed Hockey Club Nijmegen, commonly known as Nijmegen, is a Dutch field hockey club based in Nijmegen, Gelderland. It was founded on 15 September 1906 and it has a total number of 1,783 members.

The first men and women's teams compete on the second highest level of Dutch field hockey, which is called the "Promotieklasse".

Famous players 
 Janine Beermann
 Pietie Coetzee
 Eveline de Haan
 Jesse Mahieu
 Marsha Marescia
 Eefke Mulder
 Maud Mulder
 Hans Weusthof
 Roderick Weusthof

References

External links 
 Official website NMHC Nijmegen

 
Dutch field hockey clubs
Field hockey clubs established in 1906
1906 establishments in the Netherlands
Sports clubs in Nijmegen